Rumelifeneri (named after the lighthouse Rumeli Feneri) is a village in İstanbul Province, Turkey.

Geography

Rumelifeneri is in  Sarıyer intracity district of Istanbul Province. At  it is a coastal village located at the extreme northwest (i.e., European side) of the Bosphorous Strait. It is a suburb of Istanbul. The population of Rumelifeneri is 2,337 as of 2010.

History 
Archaeological evidence in the area of the village dates back to the late Byzantine era, although a now lost Greek inscription dating to the 3rd century CE was formerly on display at the Greek cemetery of the village.

The village is named after a local lighthouse, which is attested in portolans and literary sources since at least the 15th century. Petrus Gyllius, who visited it in the mid-16th century, described it as octagonal, and ascribed to it a Byzantine origin. Its Greek inhabitants named it Phanarion (Φανάριον, "lighthouse"), often in the diminutive Phanarakion (Φαναράκιον). In 1768, a fortress was built by a Greek engineer for the Ottoman Empire (Rumeli Fener Kalesi), possibly on older foundations. It is now in ruins. Rumelifeneri was involved was the rebellion of Kabakçı Mustafa.

Before World War I, the village was inhabited by Greeks—some 900 inhabitants in the late 19th century—and had a church dedicated to St. George (possibly built on a Byzantine predecessor), and the hagiasma (sacred well) known as tis Tsirpinas (της Τσίρπινας).

Economy 
Rumelifeneri is a fishermen's village. But it is very close to Istanbul, which makes the village a place of seafood restaurants specialized for daily excursion of Istanbul citizens.

References

Villages in Istanbul Province
Neighbourhoods of Sarıyer
Fishing communities in Turkey
Populated coastal places in Turkey
Bosphorus